The 2018–19 Congo Ligue 1 was the 52nd season of the Congo Ligue 1, the top-tier football league in the Republic of the Congo, since its establishment in 1961. The season started on 8 December 2018.

League table

Stadiums

References

2018 in the Republic of the Congo sport
2019 in the Republic of the Congo sport
Football competitions in the Republic of the Congo
Congo Republic